The UMC Green CPU was an x86-compatible microprocessor produced by UMC, a Taiwanese semiconductor company, in the early- to mid-1990s. It was offered as an alternative to the Intel 80486 with which it was pin compatible, enabling it to be installed in most 80486 motherboards. All models had power management features intended to reduce electricity consumption.

Models produced
The UMC Green CPU was available with different features, physical characteristics and clock speeds. Some of which were only sold in limited quantities.

Available models
All models feature an 8 KB level 1 cache and operate at clock speeds of 25 MHz, 33 MHz, or 40 MHz.

Functionally all models except U5D are identical and only differed in their intended application, voltage rating or physical packaging. The U5SD does not contain a floating point unit and is indistinguishable from other U5S chips in operation, though it is unusual because it features a 486DX pinout as opposed to the more common 486SX pinout versions. This would allow installation into certain older motherboards which may have had upgrade sockets hardwired to fit only 486DX chips.

Production and fabrication
As one of the largest chip foundry owners in Taiwan, UMC owns several fabrication plants which allowed them to fabricate their own designs, whereas some other manufacturers, notably Cyrix, had to contract this process out to third parties such as IBM and Texas Instruments. All available models of Green CPU were produced on a 0.6 μm CMOS process. The chips were available in both plastic and ceramic packages for different applications. The majority of PQFP variants were sold to motherboard manufacturers as a low-cost embedded solution.

Performance

The UMC U5 Series design was focused on microcode optimizations. An equivalently clocked Intel or AMD processor required 40 cycles to perform an integer division whereas the UMC processors required only 7, allowing the instruction to complete significantly faster. Performance is generally observed to be higher than competing processors on a clock-for-clock basis; The 40 MHz U5S model being comparable to an AMD Am486SX2 at 66 MHz with correctly configured motherboards.

Due to an error in the microcode, Microsoft Windows 98 Second Edition identifies some processors as an Intel Pentium MMX which could cause the operating system and software running within it to crash or exhibit undefined behavior.

Clock doubling version
UMC produced a small quantity of clock doubling processors labeled as the U486DX2. These processors were designed to compete with other clock doubling solutions such as the Intel 80486DX2, AMD Am486DX2 and Cyrix Cx486DX2, but due to ongoing legal troubles UMC withdrew the U486DX2 from production. The processor was only ever produced as an engineering sample and never made it to market, it was manufactured with a 0.35 μm CMOS process and is contained within a ceramic package.

Legal dispute
In 1994, Intel alleged that UMC had infringed upon its patent for the 80486 microprocessor and filed complaints against UMC and it's distributors. UMC countered the claims with an anti-trust suit and the case was eventually settled out of court with UMC withdrawing their product and ceasing production of 80486-compatible microprocessors.

As a result of the dispute, all processors were prohibited from sale within the United States and were visibly labelled as such. Placement of this label varies, the ceramic U5S and U5D models typically display "Not for U.S. sale or import" as part of the silkscreen on the top of the chip where the U5SX and U5SD models usually had "NOT FOR U.S. SALE" printed onto the golden die cover on the underside of the package. This labelling is often absent from plastic packages.

Gallery

References

X86 microprocessors